The Oxford Book of Welsh Verse in English was a 1977 poetry anthology edited by the author and academic Gwyn Jones. It covered both Welsh language poetry, in English translation, and Welsh poets writing in English (often called Anglo-Welsh poetry).

Poets in The Oxford Book of Welsh Verse in English

Publication details

References

1977 poetry books
Welsh-language literature
Welsh literature
Welsh poetry
Poetry anthologies
Anglo-Welsh literature
Welsh Verse in English, Oxford Book of
British poetry anthologies